Georgsmarienhütte is a town in the district of Osnabrück, in Lower Saxony, Germany. It is situated in the Teutoburg Forest, approx. 7 km south of Osnabrück.

History 

In 1856 the company "Georgs-Marien-Bergwerks- und Hüttenverein" was founded to erect an iron and steel works in the municipality of Malbergen. It was named after King George V of Hanover who supported industrial development, and his wife Marie. The workers’ housing estates grew and developed to the municipality Georgsmarienhütte. Malbergen became part of Georgsmarienhütte in 1937. In 1970, the municipalities Oesede, Kloster Oesede, Harderberg, Holsten-Mündrup, the southern part of Holzhausen and the "industrial village" Georgsmarienhütte were united to the city Georgsmarienhütte.

The iron and steel works were one of the most important employers south of Osnabrück, employing several thousand people. Since 1923 it belonged to Klöckner Werke AG which suffered severely from the steel crises of the 1990s. In 1993, Klöckner manager Jürgen Großmann bought the steel works for a symbolic amount of money and transformed it to an efficient company which is one of the leading high-grade steel producers in Europe.

Kloster Oesede 

The most important historical building is the church of former convent Kloster Oesede dating from the 12th century. The Benedictine convent was founded by count Ludolf von Oesede (d. 1184) and his wife Thedela for which he donated his castle complex in the first half of the century. The convent gave its name as well to the former settlement Sutorpe. Kloster Oesede now is a part of the city Georgsmarienhütte. The convent was the first one in the district of Osnabrück. The convent’s first prior was Ludolf’s eldest daughter Goda. On January, 15th 1170 conventional life began. The convent became wealthy within the centuries by donations and the nuns' labour. It existed until 1803 when it was secularisated by the Reichsdeputationshauptschluss. The convent buildings from the Middle Ages were taken down between 1790 and 1803. Only the Alte Abtei (Old Abbey) remained. A new two-storey building was erected by Alexander Ludwig von Corvey (1670–1728) in 1723. It still exists and is used for partly parish and school purposes. The former convent’s church in which the donator count Ludolf and his wife were buried now is the Roman Catholic parish church St. Johann. A remarkable detail of the church is the Hagioscope which allowed lepers to join the service from outside. Another hagioscope was exposed nearby in St. Clemens, the monastery’s church in Bad Iburg.

Transportation 
Georgsmarienhütte is served by the Osnabrück–Brackwede railway line which in turn leads to the rest of the country. 
 Oesede station
 Kloster Oesede station
The city of Osnabrück is connected by road to the Autobahn A1,  A30 and A33. In addition, there are regular and frequent bus lines with Osnabrück, as well as the surrounding countryside.

The nearest airport is the Münster Osnabrück International Airport at a distance of 32 kilometers.

Education
All of the types of German grammar schools are represented in the city. In addition to a folk high school, two boarding schools provide adult education in special courses which usually last a few days.

Museums 

Museum Villa Stahmer is a museum of local history. The building was erected in 1900 by factory owner Robert Stahmer. He lived there with his family until 1907. It was in residential use until the end of World War II when it was used by British forces. Since 1947 it was used as an employment agency. In 1980, the museum was opened.

Twin towns – sister cities

Georgsmarienhütte is twinned with:
 Emmen, Netherlands (1965)
 Ramat HaSharon, Israel (1976)
 Gmina Kłodzko, Poland (1998)

Notable people
 Joseph A. Hemann (1816–1897), German-American educator, newspaper publisher, and banker
 Walther Kranz (1884–1960), classical philologist and historian of philosophy
 Susanne Albers (born 1965), theoretical computer scientist
 Christine Adams (born 1974), pole vaulter
 Sascha Weidner (1974–2015), Photographer and artist
 Nicole Brandebusemeyer (born 1974), football defender
 Daniel Thioune (born 1974), footballer
 Richard Spiegelburg (born 1977), pole vaulter
 Silke Spiegelburg (born 1986), pole vaulter
 Alfred Weidler, German-American architect
 Oliver Zapel (born 1968), former footballer and manager

Connected to Georgsmarienhütte 
Georg V of Hanover, (1819–1878) and his wife Marie of Saxe-Altenburg (1818–1907)  gave their names to the firm Georgs-Marien-Bergwerks- and Hüttenverein, founded in 1856, and are thus the namesakes of the present city of Georgsmarienhütte.
 Jan Korte (born 1977), since 2005 a Member of  the Bundestag, grew up in Oesede, Abitur at the Gymnasium Oesede in 1997.

References

Osnabrück (district)